Lanuvio is a  (municipality) in the Metropolitan City of Rome in the Italian region of Latium, located about  southeast of Rome, on the Alban Hills.

Lanuvio borders the following municipalities: Aprilia, Ariccia, Genzano di Roma, Velletri.

History

In ancient times Lanuvium was an important town in the hinterland of Imperial Rome. The emperors Antoninus Pius and Commodus were born here. It decayed after the reign of Theodosius I (late 4th century AD), and was mostly abandoned due to the shutting down of its polytheistic sanctuaries.

It is mentioned again in the 11th century, when it was a seat of a Benedictine monastery. In the early 15th century it was acquired by the Colonna family, to whom it belonged until 1564.

On 17 February 1944, during World War II, it was bombed by sea and air by the Allied, and almost entirely destroyed.

Main sights
Collegiate church
Sanctuary of Madonna delle Grazie
History center with walls, including four towers
Temple of Juno Sospita
Remains of the ancient Roman bridge Ponte Loreto
Regional Park of the Castelli Romani
Civic Museum of Lanuvio

Twin towns
 Centuripe, Italy

References

External links

 Official website
 Social website

Cities and towns in Lazio
Castelli Romani